Anuket was the ancient Egyptian goddess of the cataracts of the Nile and Lower Nubia in general, worshipped especially at Elephantine near the First Cataract.

Etymology
In ancient Egyptian, she was known as Anuket, Anaka, or Anqet. Her name meant the "Clasper" or "Embracer". In Greek, this became Anoukis, sometimes also spelled Anukis. In the interpretatio graeca, she was considered equivalent to Hestia or Vesta.

Depictions 
Anuket was usually depicted as a woman with a headdress of either reed or ostrich feathers She was usually depicted as holding a sceptre topped with an ankh, and her sacred animal was the gazelle. She was also shown suckling the pharaoh through the New Kingdom and became a goddess of lust in later years. In later periods, she was associated with the cowry, especially the shell, which resembled the vagina.

History and roles 
She was originally the daughter of Ra, but was always related to Satet in some way. For example, both goddesses were called the "Eye of Ra", along with Bastet, Hathor, and Sekhmet. Also, they were both related in some way to the Uraeus.

Worship

Anuket was part of a triad with the god Khnum, and the goddess Satis. She may have been the sister of the goddess Satis or she may have been a junior consort to Khnum instead.

A temple dedicated to Anuket was erected on the Island of Seheil. Inscriptions show that a shrine or altar was dedicated to her at this site by the 13th Dynasty pharaoh Sobekhotep III. Much later, during the 18th Dynasty, Amenhotep II dedicated a chapel to the goddess.

During the New Kingdom, Anuket's cult at Elephantine included a river procession of the goddess during the first month of Shemu. Inscriptions mention the processional festival of Khnum and Anuket during this period.

Ceremonially, when the Nile started its annual flood, the Festival of Anuket began. People threw coins, gold, jewelry, and precious gifts into the river, in thanks to the goddess for the life-giving water and returning benefits derived from the wealth provided by her fertility. The taboo held in several parts of Egypt, against eating certain fish which were considered sacred, was lifted during this time, suggesting that a fish species of the Nile was a totem for Anuket and that they were consumed as part of the ritual of her major religious festival.

References

Citations

Bibliography
 .

Further reading
 

Egyptian goddesses
Sea and river goddesses
Personifications of rivers
Elephantine